Dehik (also Romanized as Dehīk; also known as Dehīki) is a village in Momenabad Rural District, in the Central District of Sarbisheh County, South Khorasan Province, Iran. At the 2006 census, its population was 153, in 44 families.

References 

Populated places in Sarbisheh County